Ceranthia tenuipalpis is a species of tachinid flies in the genus Ceranthia of the family Tachinidae.

Distribution
United Kingdom, Russia, Germany.

References

Diptera of Europe
Tachininae
Insects described in 1921
Taxa named by Joseph Villeneuve de Janti